Mount Morrison is a foothill on the eastern flank of the Front Range of the Rocky Mountains of North America. Red Rocks Amphitheatre is located on the eastern side of the mountain.

See also

List of Colorado mountain ranges
List of Colorado mountain summits
List of Colorado fourteeners
List of Colorado 4000 meter prominent summits
List of the most prominent summits of Colorado
List of Colorado county high points

References

External links

Mountains of Colorado
Mountains of Jefferson County, Colorado
North American 2000 m summits